Two ships in the United States Navy have been named USS Jenkins for Rear Admiral Thornton A. Jenkins.

 The first  was a modified  launched in 1914 and decommissioned in 1919 after service in World War I
 The second  was a  launched in 1942 and decommissioned by 1971

United States Navy ship names